Aphanitoma mariottinii is a species of sea snail, a marine gastropod mollusk in the family Borsoniidae.

Description

Distribution
This marine species occurs in the Alboran Sea, Western Mediterranean.

References

 Smriglio C., Rufini S. & Martin Perez J.M. (2001). Rediscovery of the genus Aphanitoma in the Mediterranean Sea with description of Aphanitoma mariottinii nov. sp.. La Conchiglia 299: 39–43

External links
 

Aphanitoma
Gastropods described in 2001